The John Donne Memorial is a bronze bust of John Donne by Nigel Boonham, installed in the garden to the south of St Paul's Cathedral in London, United Kingdom. Donne faces east towards his birthplace on Bread Street. Below the bust is an inscription with the text

It was commissioned by the City of London, led by Alderman Hall, and marks the first public memorial to Donne.

References

External links
 

Bronze sculptures in the United Kingdom
Busts in the United Kingdom
Monuments and memorials in London
Outdoor sculptures in London
Busts of writers
Sculptures of men in the United Kingdom
City of London